Jane Mead (August 13, 1958 – September 8, 2019) was an American poet and the author of five poetry collections. Her last volume was To the Wren: Collected & New Poems 1991-2019 (Alice James Books, 2019). Her honors included fellowships from the Lannan and Guggenheim foundations and a Whiting Award. Her poems appeared in literary journals and magazines including Ploughshares, Electronic Poetry Review, The American Poetry Review, The New York Times, the Virginia Quarterly Review, and The Antioch Review and in anthologies including The Best American Poetry 1990.

Born in Baltimore, Mead lived in Cambridge, Massachusetts, until she was twelve. Her father taught ichthyology at Harvard University.  After Cambridge, she moved around a great deal with her mother and stepfather, who was a journalist, living in New Mexico, London, and Cambridge, England. She graduated from Vassar College and from Syracuse University and the University of Iowa. She taught and was Poet-in-Residence at Wake Forest University.

After her father died in 2003, Mead managed the family ranch in Napa County, Northern California.  She taught at New England College and co-owned Prairie Lights in Iowa City, Iowa.

Mead died September 8, 2019, in Napa, from cancer.

Honors and awards
 2017 World of Made and Unmade shortlisted for 2017 Griffin Poetry Prize
 2004 Ploughshares Cohen Award
 2002 Guggenheim Fellowship
 1992 Whiting Award
 Lannan Foundation Completion Grant

Published works
Full-length poetry collections

Anthologies edited

In anthology

References

External links
 "An Interview with Jane Mead" > Poetry Daily
 Profile at The Whiting Foundation
 Poem: "The Origin", poets.org
 Poem: "Alleged Speculation", Electronic Poetry Review
 Poem: "The Specter and His World are One ", Electronic Poetry Review
 Poem: "The High Hither, The Embrace", Electronic Poetry Review
 Poem: "The Part—and the Whole of It", Electronic Poetry Review

1958 births
2019 deaths
21st-century American women
American women academics
American women poets
Deaths from cancer in California
New England College faculty
The New Yorker people
Poets from California
Poets from Maryland
Syracuse University alumni
University of Iowa alumni
Vassar College alumni
Wake Forest University faculty
Writers from Baltimore